Inma Puig is a Spanish psychologist.

Career

In 2003, Puig was appointed psychologist of Spanish La Liga side Barcelona.

References

Living people
Spanish psychologists
Spanish women psychologists
Sports psychologists
Year of birth missing (living people)